The André Baronetcy, of Southampton in the County of Southampton, was a title in the Baronetage of Great Britain. It was created on 4 March 1781 for William André, in recognition of the services rendered to the country by his brother John André, who was executed in 1780 after being convicted of espionage by an American tribunal during the American Revolutionary War. The title became extinct on William André's death in 1802.

André baronets, of Southampton (1781)
Sir William Lewis André, 1st Baronet (1760–1802)

Notes

Sources
 

Extinct baronetcies in the Baronetage of Great Britain